The 1930 George Washington Colonials football team was an American football team that represented George Washington University as an independent during the 1930 college football season. In their second season under head coach Jim Pixlee, the team compiled a 4–4–1 record.

Schedule

References

George Washington
George Washington Colonials football seasons
George Washington Colonials football